The Stade des Martyrs de la Pentecôte (Martyrs of Pentecost Stadium), also known as simply the Stade des Martyrs and formerly known as Stade Kamanyola, is a national stadium located in the town of Lingwala in Kinshasa, the capital of the Democratic Republic of the Congo. It is mainly used for football matches and has organised many concerts and athletics competitions. It also  hosted a speech by Pope Francis in February 2023.

It is the home stadium of the National Team of the Democratic Republic of the Congo and the AS Vita Club and DC Motema Pembe of Championship Democratic Republic of the Congo football. The stadium has a capacity of 80,000.

History 
The Stade des Martyrs was originally called Stade Kamanyola. Construction began on October 14, 1988 and ended on October 14, 1993. It replaced the former National Stadium, the Stade Tata Raphaël.

In 1997, the stadium was renamed  in memory of four ministers purged by Mobutu Sese Seko and hanged at the site on 2 June 1966: Évariste Kimba, Jérôme Anany, Emmanuel Bamba, and Alexandre Mahamba.

See also
Stade Cardinal Malula

References

External links

Photos at cafe.daum.net/stade
Photos at worldstadiums.com
Stadium information
Stadium picture
Photo at fussballtempel.net

Sports venues completed in 1994
Stade des Martyrs
Stade des Martyrs
Sport in Kinshasa
Athletics (track and field) venues in the Democratic Republic of the Congo
Congo, Democratic Republic of
Football venues in the Democratic Republic of the Congo
Chinese aid to Africa
1994 establishments in Zaire
Lukunga District